Edward Grzymała (29 September 1906 – 1942) was a Polish and Roman Catholic priest. He was imprisoned in the Nazi concentration camp at Sachsenhausen. He died at the concentration camp in Dachau. In 1999, he was beatified by Pope John Paul II. He is one of the 108 Martyrs of World War II.

See also 
List of Nazi-German concentration camps
The Holocaust in Poland
World War II casualties of Poland

References

1906 births
1942 deaths
20th-century Polish Roman Catholic priests
Sachsenhausen concentration camp prisoners
Polish people who died in Dachau concentration camp